The Taming of the West may refer to:

 The Taming of the West (1925 film), 1925 silent film western directed by Arthur Rosson
 The Taming of the West (1939 film), 1939 American western film directed by Norman Deming